eCupid is a 2011 American romantic comedy film directed by J. C. Calciano and starring Houston Rhines, Noah Schuffman and Morgan Fairchild. The title is a portmanteau of the names of dating websites eHarmony and OkCupid. The film found success at a variety of notable gay & lesbian film festivals including The 29th Los Angeles Gay & Lesbian Film Festival, The San Francisco Lesbian & Gay Film Festival (Frameline) and Newfest.

Plot
Marshall Thomas (Houston Rhines), an advertising designer, and his partner of seven years, cafe owner Gabe Horton (Noah Schuffman), who live in Los Angeles, California, are in a rut. Gabe seems too busy for intimacy and Marshall is feeling the pressure of a frustrating dead-end job. Marshall discovers a smart phone application called eCupid and agrees to install it without reading the terms of agreement (despite multiple warnings.) The application (voiced by Morgan Fairchild) proceeds to take over Marshall's phone and computer, and by proxy his life. Gabe finds out and the two split. eCupid begins arranging various encounters and situations designed to help Marshall find the things he thinks he wants: the recapturing of his youth via fun, romance and freedom.

Cast
Houston Rhines as Marshall Thomas
Noah Schuffman as Gabriel "Gabe" Horton
Morgan Fairchild as Venus
Mike C. Manning as Myles
John Callahan as Mr. Hutchington
Galen Drever as Dawson
Matthew Scott Lewis as Keith
Brad Pennington as Richard
Gary Riotto as Carson
Chris Rubeiz as Jimmy
Andy Anderson as Chris 1
Joe Komara as Chris 2
George Gray as TV Announcer
Matthew Gittelson as Customer
Peter A. O'Riordan as Go Go dancer
Scott Pretty as Party Goer (uncredited)

Reception

Critical response
Robert Koehler of Variety gave the film a mixed review, noting that it would "find an edge in niche markets" but that it featured "uninspired writing (and) acting".

References

Citations

Sources

External links
 
 
 2011 Los Angeles Gay & Lebian Film Festival 
 Newfest 

2011 independent films
2011 LGBT-related films
2011 romantic comedy films
2011 films
American independent films
American LGBT-related films
American romantic comedy films
Films shot in Los Angeles
Gay-related films
LGBT-related romantic comedy films
2010s English-language films
2010s American films